50/50 is a 2011 American comedy-drama film directed by Jonathan Levine, written by Will Reiser, and starring Joseph Gordon-Levitt, Seth Rogen, Anna Kendrick, Bryce Dallas Howard, and Anjelica Huston. The film is loosely inspired by Reiser's own experience with cancer, with Rogen's character Kyle based on Rogen himself. It was filmed from February to March 2010. 50/50 was released on September 30, 2011, and grossed $41 million. It received critical acclaim, with particular praise for Gordon-Levitt's performance and Reiser's screenplay.

Plot
Mild-mannered Adam Lerner is a 27-year-old public radio journalist in Seattle. His best friend Kyle, who is rather crude, disapproves of his girlfriend Rachael, an artist. After experiencing severe pains in his back, Adam is diagnosed with schwannoma neurofibrosarcoma, a cancerous tumor in his spine, and must undergo chemotherapy. He sees on the Internet that the survival rate for his diagnosis is 50/50. After Adam reveals this, his emotional mother, Diane, who nurses her Alzheimer's-stricken husband Richard, offers to care for him, but Adam declines as Rachael has already promised to do so.

At one of his treatments, Adam meets Mitch and Alan, two older cancer patients also undergoing chemo, and they become friends, bonding through cannabis-laced macaroons. Rachael is uncomfortable during his treatments and is often late picking him up. She also gets him a retired racing greyhound named Skeletor as a pet. Throughout Adam's struggle, Kyle attempts to keep up his morale, helping Adam shave his head and using his friend's illness to pick up women. While on a date, Kyle sees Rachael kissing another man at a gallery and later forces her to confess her infidelity to Adam, who breaks up with her. He follows Kyle's suggestion, and they use his illness to pick up two women at a bar.

Meanwhile, Adam is being treated by a young, inexperienced therapist, Katherine McKay, a PhD candidate doing the clinical aspect of her thesis at the hospital. While their relationship and sessions begin unevenly, he slowly begins to open up to her. After she drives him home following a chemo session, they develop a rapport, blurring their professional and personal relationship. She helps Adam understand his mother's situation: loved ones can feel just as much stress as the patient, which helps Adam repair the rift between him and his mother.

When Mitch dies, Adam's mortality hits him, causing him to lash out at Katherine verbally, and shortly thereafter, he is informed that he needs to undergo a risky surgery. The night before the operation, Adam argues with an intoxicated Kyle, demanding that he let him drive his car even though he has never learned and has no driver's license. After a near miss, Adam breaks down and accuses Kyle of being more concerned with using the cancer for his own gain than taking his condition seriously. Adam then calls Katherine and tells her he wishes she was his girlfriend, but he also says he is tired of being sick and just wants his cancer to be over. That night, dropping off Kyle (who was too drunk to drive), Adam finds the book Facing Cancer Together from their trip to a bookstore where Kyle picked up a shop clerk. The book is filled with notes, highlighted paragraphs, and turned-down pages. He realizes that Kyle sincerely cares about him and has been earnestly trying to help him since his diagnosis.

The next day, Kyle drops Adam off at the hospital, where Adam embraces him for being a good friend and apologizes for the previous night. After saying his tearful farewells to his family, he undergoes surgery. Katherine goes to the waiting room and inadvertently meets Adam's parents and Kyle during the wait. After the surgery, they are told that although the bone degradation was worse than they believed, the surgeons removed the tumor successfully, and Adam will recover. Sometime later, he is preparing for a date with Katherine, while Kyle encourages him and bandages the incision on his back. After Kyle leaves, Katherine asks, "Now what?" and Adam smiles, finally free of cancer.

Cast

Development and production
The screenplay is loosely based on the experience of screenwriter Will Reiser, friend of the film's co-lead, Seth Rogen. Reiser is also close with Evan Goldberg of Da Ali G Show. The film was going to be called I'm with Cancer before it was announced that this was a working title. The film was later renamed Live with It and then 50/50.

James McAvoy was going to play the lead role before he left the film due to personal reasons, as he was afraid of missing the birth of his first child, and was replaced by Joseph Gordon-Levitt.

Principal photography took place in Vancouver over a five-week period, beginning in March 2010.

The head-shaving scene in the film was featured on the movie posters and commercials. At the 50/50 premiere in New York, Gordon-Levitt said, "We only had one take because you can't shave your head twice." Rogen recalled, "It was the first day of filming, and we improvised the whole thing, which is not wise when it's something you have one take for, but it turned out funny."

Reception

Critical response
 Metacritic, which assigns a weighted average score, gives the film a score of 72 out of 100, based on 42 critics, indicating "generally favorable reviews".

Sean Burns wrote in the Philadelphia Weekly that Levine "knows how to stay out of the way long enough to let a very talented cast shine, and Rogen's fundamental, unexpected decency, which can often only be expressed through shoulder-punching obscenities, grows more quietly moving as the picture wears on."

David Schmader, writing in the Stranger, praises "'50/50's stellar cast, from the omnipresent lead Joseph Gordon-Levitt (whose Rankin/Bass puppet face is put to beautifully nuanced use) to the all-star supporting cast: Anjelica Huston roars back to prominence with a twisty performance as Adam's barely contained mess of a mom, and Anna Kendrick's young doctoral student makes the film's rom-com aspirations not-ridiculous with her intelligent spontaneity and cute smile. But the comedy star is Seth Rogen, cast in the same role he played in screenwriter Reiser's life."

Accolades
The film was nominated for two awards at the 69th Golden Globe Awards. Gordon-Levitt received a nomination for Best Actor (Musical or Comedy) and the film itself was nominated for Best Picture (Musical or Comedy).

Seth Rogen addressed the film's lack of an Academy Award nomination in an interview with Entertainment Weekly, saying he predicted that it wouldn't be nominated, saying that he knew for a fact that "some people are appalled by the movie." He said of this, "I think it must be people who have very, very personal connections to the subject matter and just can't emotionally disconnect from their own experience. I respect that. But what we found for the most part is that people like to laugh at tragedy. It makes them feel better."

Top ten lists
The film was included in the following top ten lists for the best films of 2011:

Home media
50/50 was released on DVD and Blu-ray Disc in North America on January 24, 2012. Both releases include commentary, deleted scenes, and behind-the-scenes videos.

Songs
No official soundtrack was released; however, a number of pop songs appear in the film, such as:
 "High and Dry" – Radiohead
 "The Other Side of Mt. Heart Attack" – Liars
 "Bricks or Coconuts" – Jacuzzi Boys
 "Simplicity" – Harmony & Balance
 "New Country" – The Walkmen
 "To Love Somebody" – Bee Gees
 "Work to Do" – The Aggrolites
 "Turn It Down" – Sideway Runners
 "Stay the Same" – autoKratz
 "Soul Connection" – The Diplomats of Solid Sound
 "Too Late for Dancing" – Shapes and Sizes
 "Days Gone Down (Still Got the Light in Your Eyes)" – Gerry Rafferty
 "Crying" – Roy Orbison
 "Yellow Ledbetter" – Pearl Jam

References

External links

 
 
 
 
 
 

2011 comedy-drama films
2011 films
American comedy-drama films
Biographical films about journalists
2010s English-language films
Films about cancer in the United States
Films directed by Jonathan Levine
Films produced by Seth Rogen
Films scored by Michael Giacchino
Films set in Seattle
Films shot in Vancouver
Mandate Pictures films
Point Grey Pictures films
Summit Entertainment films
2011 independent films
Films produced by Evan Goldberg
2010s American films
English-language comedy-drama films